State Road 115, is an IIA-class road in northern Serbia, connecting Srbobran with Čurug. It is located in Vojvodina.

Before the new road categorization regulation given in 2013, the route wore the following name: P 129.

The existing route is a regional road with two traffic lanes. By the valid Space Plan of Republic of Serbia the road is not planned for upgrading to main road, and is expected to be conditioned in its current state.
The construction phase of section between Nadalj and Čurug hasn't been commenced yet.

Sections

See also 
 Roads in Serbia

References

External links 
 Official website – Roads of Serbia (Putevi Srbije)
 Official website – Corridors of Serbia (Koridori Srbije) (Serbian)

State roads in Serbia